Eva-Maria Schimak (born 11 August 1986) is an Austrian competitive sailor. She was born in Schärding, Austria. At the 2012 Summer Olympics, she competed in the women's 470 class where, alongside crewmate Lara Vadlau, she finished 20th.

References

External links
 
 
 

1986 births
Living people
Austrian female sailors (sport)
Olympic sailors of Austria
Sailors at the 2012 Summer Olympics – 470
Sportspeople from Upper Austria
People from Schärding District